Karpatiosorbus devoniensis is known by the English name of Devon whitebeam and formally as Broad-leaved Whitebeam. When the fruit was reported as sold at Barnstaple Pannier Market  the name French Eagles was used, apart from 1929 when they were reported as eagle-berries. When the trees were reported as seen growing wild on botanical walks they were referred to as French Hails (once each as French hail and French Hales). Broad-leaved white-beam, which was the common name until Devon Whitebeam took over, was used once in 1907. The term Otmast was used once as a pet name, as its true identity was not known. It is a species of whitebeam, trees and shrubs in the family Rosaceae. It is endemic to the British Isles, growing wild in areas of Devon, Cornwall, Somerset and south-east Ireland as a native and north-east Ireland as an introduction.

It probably did not exist before the last ice age, arising from a hybrid between Sorbus torminalis the wild service tree and another whitebeam. It is a close relative of the No Parking whitebeam, Karpatiosorbus admonitor, and two other British natives and around 40 species in Europe.

Description

It will form a deciduous tree to about 12 metres height.

The leaves are entire, lobed, dark green above, the underside has a dense layer of grey hairs.

It flowers at the end of May, they are white with 5 petals.

The fruits ripen at the end of October. They are orange-brown to brown, and edible.

Locations found

 along the River Taw and River Torridge
 Roborough Down near Plymouth is where the type specimen was taken
 Little Haldon, at Bishopsteignton along the Postman's Path
 Boyton, Cornwall
 South East and North East Ireland (rarely)
 Halsdon Nature Reserve near Great Torrington managed by the Devon Wildlife Trust - a small tree
 Uppacott Wood Nature reserve between Barnstaple and Bideford also managed by the Devon Wildlife Trust, has a few trees
 Watergate Bridge near Great Torrington, grid ref SS468175 (questionable as bright red berries). The plant growing on the old platform has been removed
 Leigh Cross, Zeal Monachorum
 Watergate, Horwood
 Washington Park Arboretum in Seattle, WA, USA. Some plants in cultivation are incorrectly named so this should be verified
 Between Martinhoe and Lynton in heath and woodland. Importantly not in the East Lyn valley as those plants are Sorbus admonitor

References

Trees of the United Kingdom
devoniensis
Endemic flora of the United Kingdom
Taxobox binomials not recognized by IUCN